Magda Wiet-Henin (born 31 August 1995) is a French taekwondo athlete. She won the silver medal at the 2018 European Taekwondo Championships. She has qualified to the 2020 Summer Olympics through the 2021 European Taekwondo Olympic Qualification Tournament.

She won one of the bronze medals in the women's 67 kg event at the 2022 Mediterranean Games held in Oran, Algeria.

Personal life

Wiet-Hénin is the daughter of Valérie Hénin and Orlando Wiet.

References

External links
 

French female taekwondo practitioners
Living people
1995 births
World Taekwondo Championships medalists
Medalists at the 2019 Summer Universiade
Universiade medalists in taekwondo
Universiade gold medalists for France
European Taekwondo Championships medalists
Taekwondo practitioners at the 2020 Summer Olympics
Competitors at the 2022 Mediterranean Games
Mediterranean Games bronze medalists for France
Mediterranean Games medalists in taekwondo
Olympic taekwondo practitioners of France
21st-century French women